Colonel Roger Kirkby (c. 1649 – 8 February 1709) was an English soldier and politician, of Kirkby Ireleth in Lancashire, the eldest son of Richard Kirkby and his first wife Elizabeth Murray.

An ensign in the Coldstream Guards in 1670, he was a captain in Charles Wheeler's Regiment of Foot in 1678, and colonel in Sir James Leslie's Regiment of Foot in 1689. By this time, he had succeeded his father as Member of Parliament for Lancaster.

He was Governor of Chester from 1693 until 1702, and was chosen High Sheriff of Lancashire for 1709 but died in office.

On 7 August 1692, he married Catherine Baker, and had a son:
Richard Baker Kirkby (d. 4 May 1717)

References

1640s births
1709 deaths
English army officers
High Sheriffs of Lancashire
Lancashire Militia officers
English MPs 1685–1687
English MPs 1689–1690
English MPs 1690–1695
English MPs 1695–1698
English MPs 1698–1700
English MPs 1701
English MPs 1701–1702